John Hamilton Lawrence, 2nd Baron Lawrence (1 October 1846 – 22 August 1913) was a British peer and Conservative politician.

Lawrence was the son of John Laird Lawrence, 1st Baron Lawrence, Viceroy of India, and Harriett Katherine Hamilton. Sir Henry Montgomery Lawrence and George St Patrick Lawrence were his uncles. He succeeded his father as second Baron Lawrence in 1879 and took his seat on the Conservative benches in the House of Lords. In 1895 he was appointed a Lord-in-waiting (government whip in the House of Lords) in the Conservative administration of Lord Salisbury, a post he held until 1905, the last three years under the premiership of Arthur Balfour.

Lord Lawrence married Mary Caroline, only daughter of Richard Campbell, in 1872. He died in August 1913, aged 66, and was succeeded in his titles by his son Alexander. Lady Lawrence died in 1938.

Notes

External links
 

1846 births
1913 deaths
Barons in the Peerage of the United Kingdom
Conservative Party (UK) Baronesses- and Lords-in-Waiting